Moriarty: The Hound of the D'Urbervilles is a Sherlock Holmes pastiche novel by Bram Stoker Award–winner Kim Newman.

The novel, in the form of a series of connected stories, purports to be the memoirs of Colonel Sebastian Moran which detail his adventures with Professor Moriarty in what Empire Online describes as "a dark mirror for Sir Arthur Conan Doyle's heroes."

Reception
Publishers Weekly called it a "delightfully roguish alternate take on the Sherlock Holmes canon." The Independent praised the work and compared Newman's Moran to George MacDonald Fraser's Harry Flashman.

Adaptation
In July 2018, Deadline Hollywood reported that Playground Entertainment was developing an adaptation for television.

References

External links
Kim Newman
Moriarty: The Hound of the D'Urbervilles at Titan Books

2011 British novels
Sherlock Holmes novels
Sherlock Holmes pastiches
Titan Books titles